Tadas Labukas (born 10 January 1984 in Alytus) is a Lithuanian footballer, who lastly played for the Lithuanian A Lyga club FK Atlantas.

Career

Club
He was a striker for Arka Gdynia, having signed a two-year contract in July 2009. He was released from Arka Gdynia on 30 June 2011. But, after going on a brief trial, he joined Brann on a short-term contract which could be extended. Before the start of the 2012 season Labukas joined the Latvian Higher League club Skonto Riga. He scored 11 goals in 28 league matches for his club, sharing the club's top scorer's honor with Valērijs Šabala. In January 2013 Labukas left Riga, joining the Russian First Division club Torpedo Moscow. In February 2014, he left Russia to join new A Lyga club FK Trakai. After successful season Tadas was signed by Polish I liga club Miedź Legnica, but after the season ended chose to return to Lithuania and help Trakai. In January 2017 Labukas decided to extend his contract with Lithuanian vice-champions, but it was terminated during the season.

Career statistics

References

External links
 
 
 
 

1984 births
Living people
Sportspeople from Alytus
Lithuanian footballers
Lithuania international footballers
Lithuanian expatriate footballers
Association football forwards
FK Atlantas players
FK Žalgiris players
FK Riteriai players
FC Dynamo Moscow reserves players
Vyzas F.C. players
ASC Oțelul Galați players
Shamakhi FK players
Arka Gdynia players
SK Brann players
Skonto FC players
FC Torpedo Moscow players
Miedź Legnica players
A Lyga players
Liga I players
Azerbaijan Premier League players
Ekstraklasa players
Eliteserien players
Latvian Higher League players
Expatriate footballers in Russia
Lithuanian expatriate sportspeople in Russia
Expatriate footballers in Greece
Lithuanian expatriate sportspeople in Greece
Expatriate footballers in Romania
Lithuanian expatriate sportspeople in Romania
Expatriate footballers in Azerbaijan
Lithuanian expatriate sportspeople in Azerbaijan
Expatriate footballers in Poland
Lithuanian expatriate sportspeople in Poland
Expatriate footballers in Norway
Lithuanian expatriate sportspeople in Norway
Expatriate footballers in Latvia
Lithuanian expatriate sportspeople in Latvia